Cockerell Peninsula is a bulb-shaped peninsula covered in ice, located between Lafond Bay and Huon Bay on the north coast of Trinity Peninsula. It was discovered by the French Antarctic Expedition, 1837–40, under Captain Jules Dumont d'Urville. It was named in 1977 by the UK Antarctic Place-Names Committee after Sir Christopher Sydney Cockerell, British pioneer of the hovercraft.

References
 

Peninsulas of Graham Land
Landforms of Trinity Peninsula